Owhiro may refer to one of several places in New Zealand:

Brooklyn, Wellington, a Wellington suburb formerly known as Ohiro or Owhiro
Owhiro, Otago, a rural area near Allanton in Otago
Owhiro, Waikato, a small settlement on the shore of Kawhia Harbour
Ōwhiro Bay, Wellington, formerly known as Owhiro Bay
Owhiro Stream, a tributary of the Taieri River